The Senior Bowl is an annual college football all-star game. 

Senior Bowl may also refer to:
 Middlesex RFU Senior Bowl, an annual rugby union knock-out club competition held in England
 Senior Bowl (bridge), a biennial world championship contract bridge tournament, also known as the d'Orsi Bowl

See also
Lockheed D-21, an American supersonic reconnaissance drone, code named SENIOR BOWL
Senior Cup (disambiguation)